Chang'e 7 is a planned robotic Chinese lunar exploration mission expected to be launched in 2026 to target the lunar south pole. Like its predecessors, the spacecraft is named after the Chinese moon goddess Chang'e. The mission will include an orbiter, a lander, a mini-hopping probe, and two rover including Rashid 2 rover provided by the United Arab Emirates.

Overview 
The Chinese Lunar Exploration Program is designed to be conducted in four phases of incremental technological advancement: The first is simply reaching lunar orbit, a task completed by Chang'e 1 in 2007 and Chang'e 2 in 2010. The second is landing and roving on the Moon, as Chang'e 3 did in 2013 and Chang'e 4 did in 2019 (The rover still being active as of early 2022). The third is collecting lunar samples from the near-side and sending them to Earth, a task accomplished by Chang'e 5 in 2020/21 and to be met by the future Chang'e 6 mission. The fourth phase consists of development of a robotic research station near the Moon's south pole. The program aims to facilitate a crewed lunar landing in the 2030s and possibly build an outpost near the lunar south pole.

Scientific objectives
The official scientific objectives of Chang'e 7 mission are:
 Investigation and study of lunar surface environment and water ice in its soil.
 High-precision investigation and study of morphology, composition and structure of the Moon.
 Investigation and study of interior structure, magnetic field and thermal characteristics of the Moon.
 General investigation and study of surface environment of the south pole of the Moon.
 Moon-based observation and study of the Earth's magnetotail and plasmasphere.

Launch
The probe will be launched by a Long March 5 rocket in 2026, from the Wenchang Satellite Launch Center on Hainan Island.

References

External links

Chinese Lunar Exploration Program
Missions to the Moon
Chinese space probes
2026 in China
2026 in spaceflight